Ulrico Girardi (3 July 1930 in Cortina d'Ampezzo – 18 December 1986) was an Italian bobsledder who competed in the mid-1950s. He won a silver medal in the four-man event at the 1956 Winter Olympics in Cortina d'Ampezzo.

References

Bobsleigh four-man Olympic medalists for 1924, 1932-56, and since 1964
DatabaseOlympics.com profile

1930 births
1986 deaths
People from Cortina d'Ampezzo
Bobsledders at the 1956 Winter Olympics
Italian male bobsledders
Olympic bobsledders of Italy
Olympic silver medalists for Italy
Olympic medalists in bobsleigh
Medalists at the 1956 Winter Olympics
Sportspeople from the Province of Belluno